Bedford Falls may refer to:

Bedford Falls (It's a Wonderful Life), fictional town in the 1946 film 
Bedford Falls Productions, a TV and film production company 
a fictional town in the 1990 book Better Than Life by Grant Naylor